Town Creek is a stream in the U.S. state of Georgia. It is a tributary to Talking Rock Creek.

Town Creek was named for the fact it once flowed past an Indian town site.

References

Rivers of Georgia (U.S. state)
Rivers of Gilmer County, Georgia
Rivers of Pickens County, Georgia